is a Japanese freestyle skier, specializing in  moguls.

Ozaki competed at the 2006 and  2010 Winter Olympics for Japan. His best finish was in 2010, finishing 24th in the preliminary round of the moguls event. In 2006, he finished 30th.

As of February 2013, his best showing at the World Championships came in 2009, where he finished 16th in the moguls event.

Ozaki made his World Cup debut in February 2004. As of February 2013, he has made a World Cup podium once, winning silver at Inawashiro in 2005/06. His best World Cup overall finish is 13th, in 2005/06.

World Cup Podiums

References

External links
 JOC Vancouver 2010 official profile 

1984 births
Living people
Olympic freestyle skiers of Japan
Freestyle skiers at the 2006 Winter Olympics
Freestyle skiers at the 2010 Winter Olympics
People from Fujisawa, Kanagawa
Japanese male freestyle skiers
21st-century Japanese people